Agitated Women is a 1927 German silent drama film directed by Richard Oswald and starring Asta Nielsen, Carmen Boni and Gustav Fröhlich. It was shot at the EFA Studios in Berlin. The film's sets were designed by the art director Gustav A. Knauer.

Cast
 Asta Nielsen as Clarina, Tänzerin
 Carmen Boni as Angelica, Clarinas Tochter
 Gustav Fröhlich as Junger Fürst
 Adolphe Engers as Lutschku
 Alexander Murski as Graf Korvin
 Kurt Gerron as Wladimir, Besitzer des 'Maison Mouche'
 Camilla von Hollay as Gildi
 Olga Limburg as Fürstin Natalie Radnay
 Albert Florath as Schuster Kruk
 Jakob Tiedtke as Dr. Baran
 Harry Nestor as Eugen, Diener der Fürstin
 Georg John
 Albert Paul
 Betty Astor
 Lidiya Tridenskaya as Barbara Kruk
 Theodor Pistek
 Kurt Winkler

References

Bibliography

External links

1927 films
Films of the Weimar Republic
Films directed by Richard Oswald
German silent feature films
Films based on German novels
German black-and-white films
Films shot at Halensee Studios
1927 drama films
German drama films